University of Computer Studies (Magway), is a university located in Magway, Myanmar.

Location
The university was located in Ayemyathaya Village, and was moved to a new campus near Magyikan Village on the Magway-Taungdwingyi Road in the 2012–2013 academic year. The university, administered by the Ministry of Education, offers undergraduate and master degree programs in computer science and technology.

Programs
The university offers three-year bachelor's and four-year bachelor's (honors) degree programs. Starting in the 2012–2013 academic year, all bachelor's degree programs will take four years to complete. And from the 2012–2013 academic year, it is started 5 years studying for bachelor's degree.

Curriculum

First Year
 First Semester: Burmese, English, Physics, 101, 102, 103, 104
 Second Semester: Burmese, English, Physics, 101, 102, 103, 104

Second Year
 First Semester: English, 201, 202, 203, 204, 205, 206
 Second Semester: English, 201, 202, 203, 204, 205, 206

Third Year
 First Semester: English, 301, 302, 303, 304, 305, 306
 Second Semester: English, 301, 302, 303, 304, 305, 306

Fourth Year
 First Semester: English, 401, 402, 403, 404, 405, 406
 Second Semester: English, 401, 402, 403, 404, 405, 406

Fifth Year
 First Semester: English, 501, 502, 503, 504, 505
 Second Semester: English, 502, 503, project

Faculty

===Teaching departments===
 Faculty of Computing
 Faculty of Computer Systems and Technologies
 Faculty of Information Science
 Faculty of Computer Science
 Department of Information Technology Supporting and Maintenance
 Department of Language
 Department of Natural Science

Universities and colleges in Magway Region
Technological universities in Myanmar